Pride of the Plains is a 1944 American Western film directed by Wallace Fox and written by John K. Butler and Robert Creighton Williams. The film stars Robert Livingston, Smiley Burnette, Nancy Gay, Steve Barclay, Kenneth MacDonald and Charles Miller. The film was released on January 5, 1944, by Republic Pictures.

Plot

Laws that protect wild horses frustrate cowboy Dan Hurley (Kenneth MacDonald) who wants to sell the horses.  In an effort to get the laws changed, Hurley has his shady partners paint his trained horse to disguise it, then get the horse to kill a man; all in an effort to get his petition signed.  Hero Johnny Revere (Robert Livingston) finds suspicious traces of paint on a horse, and attempts to arrest the Hurley gang.  The effort goes south, and the bad guys capture Revere, then plan to have him be the next horse death victim.

Cast  
Robert Livingston as Johnny Revere (John Paul Revere)
Smiley Burnette as Frog Millhouse
Nancy Gay as Joan Bradford
Steve Barclay as Kenny Revere 
Kenneth MacDonald as Dan Hurley
Charles Miller as Grant Bradford
Kenne Duncan as Henchman Snyder
Jack Kirk as Henchman Steve Craig
Bud Geary as Henchman Gerard
Yakima Canutt as Henchman Bowman

References

External links
 

1944 films
American Western (genre) films
1944 Western (genre) films
Republic Pictures films
Films directed by Wallace Fox
American black-and-white films
1940s English-language films
1940s American films